Doña Leona Vicario is known as a "great heroine of the Mexican Independence." She was an orphan who was raised by her uncle and royalist guardian. She, unlike her guardians, used her wealth to support the rebellion against the Spanish monarchy. Doña Leona gave money to the rebels, provided weapons, recruited patriot soldiers, and gathered information, which she sent using a secret code.

In March 1813 she was imprisoned, but escaped and joined the rebel army of Jose Maria Morelos. During her time with the rebel army she controlled its finances, while supervising the care of the ill and the injured and the rebel government later declared her a national heroine. The first congress of independent Mexico granted her a hacienda, along with several houses in Mexico City.

References

People of the Mexican War of Independence